Salda lugubris is a species of shore bug in the family Saldidae. It is found in Central America and North America.

References

Further reading

 
 
 
 
 
 
 

Insects described in 1832
Saldidae